Cheilosia carbonaria is a European  species of hoverfly. Like most Cheilosia it is black, and because of this may often be overlooked as a hoverfly. It is little recorded, and is considered rare and scarce throughout most of its range.

Distribution
It is distributed from Scandinavia to France, and from the southern part of the  UK eastwards through most of central Europe as far south as Greece.

References

Diptera of Europe

Eristalinae
Insects described in 1860
Taxa named by Johann Egger